Abbess Grange is a neo-Elizabethan house at Leckford, Hampshire, England designed by Sir Banister Fletcher, a British architect, in 1901 for George Miles-Bailey, on the site of a former grange of St. Mary's Abbey, Winchester.  The house consists of a two-storey main block with attic and a projecting single-storey billiards hall on the left, and is built on a levelled platform cut out of the hillside.  The Dutch-gabled right-hand three bays of the main block project forward and have, in the centre, an Ionic porch with pairs of column supporting a heavy entablature.  Over the porch is a seven-light mullioned and transom window, and to either side is a three-light Ipswich window.  In 1984, the interior was said to be largely unaltered.  The house is now a country club for the John Lewis Partnership, and forms part of their Leckford estate.

References

The Architect, 25 August 1905
Building News 18 October 1901, p. 519; 20 December 1901, p. 835
A History of the County of Hampshire: Volume 4.

Country houses in Hampshire
Grade II listed buildings in Hampshire
Grade II listed houses
Houses completed in 1900